A governorate is an administrative division of a state. It is headed by a governor. As English-speaking nations tend to call regions administered by governors either states or provinces, the term governorate is often used in translation from non-English-speaking administrations.

The most common usage are as a translation of Persian "Farmandari" or the Arabic Muhafazah. It may also refer to the guberniya and general-gubernatorstvo of Imperial Russia or the gobiernos of Imperial Spain.

Arab countries
The term governorate is widely used in Arab countries to describe an administrative unit. Some governorates combine more than one Muhafazah; others closely follow traditional boundaries inherited from the Ottoman Empire's vilayet system.

With the exception of Tunisia, all translations into the term governorate originate in the Arabic word muhafazah.

Governorates of Bahrain
Governorates of Egypt
Governorates of Iraq (official translation, sometimes also translated as province)
Governorates of Jordan
Governorates of Kuwait
Governorates of Lebanon
Governorates of Oman
Governorates of Palestine
Governorates of Saudi Arabia
Governorates of Syria
Governorates of Tunisia (the local term is wilayah)
Governorates of Yemen

Russian Empire 
History of the administrative division of Russia
Governorate (Russia) and :Category:Governorates of the Russian Empire

Congress Kingdom of Poland 
See Subdivisions of Congress Poland

Grand Duchy of Finland 
 Governorates of the Grand Principality of Finland

Portuguese Empire 
In the Portuguese Empire, a governorate general (Portuguese: governo-geral) were a colonial administration. They usually were created in order to be a centralized government over smaller colonies or territories of the Portuguese Empire.

Governorate Generals of the Portuguese Empire:
Governorate General of Brazil (1549-1572 / 1578-1607 / 1613–1621)
Governorate General of Bahia (1572-1578 / 1607–1613)
Governorate General of Rio de Janeiro (1572-1578 / 1607–1613)

Spanish Empire 

In the Spanish Empire, the gobernaciones ("governorships" or "governorates") were an administrative division, roughly analogous to a province directly beneath the level of the audiencia or captaincy general, and the viceroy in areas directly under the viceroy's administration. The powers and duties of a governor were identical to a corregidor but a governor managed a larger or more prosperous area than the former.

Italian Empire 
 Governorates of Italian East Africa

Germany
In the modern German states of Baden-Württemberg, Bavaria, Hesse, and North Rhine-Westphalia, as well as others in the past, there are sub-state administrative regions called Regierungsbezirk, which is sometimes translated into English as "governorate" or "county."

During the time of the Third Reich, a "General Government for the Occupied Polish Areas" (German: Generalgouvernement für die besetzten polnischen Gebiete) existed. The German (based on a traditional Prussian term) is sometimes translated as General Governorate.

Romania 
During World War II, Romania administrated three governorates: the Bessarabia Governorate, the Bukovina Governorate and the Transnistria Governorate.

Ukraine 

When Ukraine claimed autonomy in 1917 and then independence from Russia in 1918, it inherited the imperial subdivision of its land with nine governorates, two okruhas, and three cities with special status. Each governorate (Ukrainian ) was subdivided by the smaller unit of county and still smaller .

By the end of the Soviet-Ukrainian war in 1920, the Soviets had made them part of the Ukrainian SSR. Soviet Ukraine was reorganized into twelve governorates, which were reduced to nine in 1922, and then replaced with okruhas in 1925.

Vatican City
Under the Fundamental Law of Vatican City State, the pope's executive authority for Vatican City is exercised by the Governorate for Vatican City State. The President of Vatican City's legislative body is ex officio the President of the Governorate. The other key officers of the Governorate are the General Secretary and the Vice General Secretary. All three officers are appointed by the pope for five-year terms.

References

Types of administrative division